Ptychobela sumatrensis is a species of sea snail, a marine gastropod mollusk in the family Pseudomelatomidae, the turrids and allies.

Description
The length of the shell varies between 23 mm and 35 mm.

Distribution
This marine species occurs off Sumatra, Indonesia.

References

 Petit de la Saussaye, S., 1852. Description de coquilles nouvelles. Journal de Conchyliologie 3: 51-59
 Fischer-Piette, E., 1950. Listes des types décrits dans le Journal de Conchyliologie et conservés dans la collection de ce journal. Journal de Conchyliologie 90: 8-23
 Kilburn, R.N., 1989. Notes on Ptychobela and Brachytoma, with the description of a new species from Mozambique (Mollusca: Gastropoda: Turridae). Annals of the Natal Museum 30: 185-196

External links
 Lectotype at MNHN, Paris
 Gastropods.com: Ptychobela sumatrense
 

sumatrensis
Gastropods described in 1852